Potim is a municipality in the state of São Paulo in Brazil. It is part of the Metropolitan Region of Vale do Paraíba e Litoral Norte. The population is 25,130 (2020 est.) in an area of 44.47 km². The elevation is 535 m.

References

Municipalities in São Paulo (state)